Mourad Okbi (born 1 September 1965) is a Tunisian retired footballer who played as a right back, and is the manager of tunisian club US Monastir

Club career
He played in the Tunisian Ligue Professionnelle 1 with JS Kairouan and in Saudi Professional League with Al-Ahli Saudi FC.

International career
He started playing with the national team in 1987, collecting 50 appearances in eight years and scored 3 goals. He also participated in the 1988 Summer Olympics in Seoul and the 1994 African Cup of Nations.

Coaching career
He Started his career in 2000 with many Tunisian teams managing ES Hammam-Sousse, JS Kairouan, US Monastir and Stade Gabésien and Saudi teams with Najran SC, Al-Shoulla F.C., Al-Watani and Abha Club and also Emirati teams with Al-Ittihad Kalba SC.
On 17 May 2017 he became the assistant of Nabil Maaloul in Tunisia and managed to qualify for the 2018 FIFA World Cup in Russia. After the departure of Nabil Maaloul, Okbi was retained with the new head coach Faouzi Benzarti.

in July 2021, Okbi was appointed as manager of US Monastir he left de club on 4 oktober 2021 and was succeeded by Faouzi Benzarti.

Honours
Managerial honours :

 US Monastir Tunisian Super Cup:'Winners'' : 2020
(due to Covid 19 the supercup was played in 2021)

References

1965 births
Living people
People from Kairouan
Tunisian footballers
Tunisia international footballers
Olympic footballers of Tunisia
Footballers at the 1988 Summer Olympics
1994 African Cup of Nations players
Tunisian Ligue Professionnelle 1 players
JS Kairouan players
Saudi Professional League players
Al-Ahli Saudi FC players
Tunisian expatriate footballers
Expatriate footballers in Saudi Arabia
Tunisian expatriate sportspeople in Saudi Arabia
Tunisian football managers
Abha Club managers
ES Hammam-Sousse managers
Najran SC managers
Al-Shoulla FC managers
JS Kairouan managers
US Monastir (football) managers
Stade Gabèsien managers
Al-Ittihad Kalba SC managers
Association football defenders
Tunisian expatriate football managers
Expatriate football managers in Saudi Arabia
Expatriate football managers in the United Arab Emirates
Tunisian expatriate sportspeople in the United Arab Emirates
UAE Pro League managers
Tunisian Ligue Professionnelle 1 managers
Saudi Professional League managers
Saudi First Division League managers